Sălceni may refer to several villages in Romania:

 Sălceni, a village in Ceatalchioi Commune, Tulcea County
 Sălceni, a village in Pochidia Commune, Vaslui County